Atractus imperfectus is a species of snake in the family Colubridae. The species can be found in Panama.

References 

Atractus
Reptiles of Panama
Endemic fauna of Panama
Reptiles described in 2003